This is a list of articles related to the Presbyterian Church in America (PCA).

Agencies and committees
Covenant College
Covenant Theological Seminary
Reformed University Fellowship

Churches 
Briarwood Presbyterian Church (Birmingham, Alabama)
Christ the King Presbyterian Church (Cambridge, Massachusetts)
College Hill Presbyterian Church (Oxford, Mississippi)
Coral Ridge Presbyterian Church (Fort Lauderdale, Florida)
Fairfield Presbyterian Church
First Presbyterian Church (Chattanooga, Tennessee)
Hickory Withe Presbyterian Church (Hickory Withe, Tennessee)
Korean Central Presbyterian Church (Centreville, Virginia)
New Hope Christian Church (Monsey, New York)
Redeemer Presbyterian Church (New York, New York)
Tenth Presbyterian Church (Philadelphia, Pennsylvania)
Third Presbyterian Church (Birmingham, Alabama)
Trinity Presbyterian Church (Charlottesville, Virginia)
Sarang Community Church of Southern California

People 
Jimmy Akin
Joel Belz
Marsha Blackburn
Anthony Bradley
Steve Brown, author
J. Oliver Buswell
Bryan Chapell
Edmund Clowney
Gary DeMar
Ligon Duncan
Dave Ferriss
Mike Folmer
John Gerstner
George Grant, author
Ben Haden
Katherine Harris
R. Laird Harris
Paul Jennings Hill
Bob Inglis
Timothy J. Keller
D. James Kennedy
George W. Knight III
Paul Kooistra
Francis Nigel Lee
Peter Leithart
Richard Lints
Rich Lusk
Allan MacRae
Gary North
Raymond C. Ortlund, Jr.
Vern Poythress
Francis Schaeffer
John Smoltz
R. C. Sproul
Jim Talent
Tullian Tchividjian
Kathy Tyers
Lee Webb, newscaster
J. Steven Wilkins

Presbyterian Church in America
Presbyterian Church in America